Eduarda Maria Rochateles Castro Coelho (born 2 March 1968) is a retired Portuguese middle-distance runner. She competed in the women's 4 × 400 metres relay at the 1992 Summer Olympics.

References

External links
 

1968 births
Living people
Athletes (track and field) at the 1992 Summer Olympics
Athletes (track and field) at the 1996 Summer Olympics
Portuguese female sprinters
Portuguese female middle-distance runners
Olympic athletes of Portugal
Place of birth missing (living people)
Olympic female sprinters